The Swing is the fourth studio album by Australian rock band INXS, released in April 1984. It peaked at number one on the Kent Music Report Albums Chart for five non-consecutive weeks from early April to mid-May 1984. The lead single "Original Sin" was recorded in New York City with Nile Rodgers and featured Daryl Hall on backing vocals. Overall, the album featured a slightly harder-edged sound than their previous releases.

Background
By 1983 Australian rock band INXS attempted to expand their international profile with their fourth studio album, The Swing. The Sydney-based group had formed in 1977 by three brothers Andrew on guitar and keyboards; Jon on percussion and drums; and Tim Farriss on guitar; together with Garry Gary Beers on bass guitar; Michael Hutchence on lead vocals; and Kirk Pengilly on guitar, saxophone, and vocals.

In September 1983 the band travelled to New York City to work with Nile Rodgers as producer at his Power Station studio. It was the first time the group had recorded outside Australia and provided the album's lead single, "Original Sin" (December 1983). Rodgers asked Daryl Hall of Hall & Oates to guest on backing vocals for the chorus, Hall later recalled "I don't know why because they're good singers, they didn't need me but I did it anyway".

All four singles were co-written by Andrew with Hutchence, while other album tracks were generally written with one or more additional band members.

From December INXS were working with Nick Launay (Midnight Oil, Models) at The Manor Studio in Oxfordshire, to complete the rest of the album. A cassette extended play of remixes, Dekadance, was also released in Australia.

Reception

Critical response

AllMusic's Stephen Thomas Erlewine noted that The Swing "retains the new wave pop sense and rock attack of their earlier albums, while adding a stronger emphasis on dance rhythms". He liked the improved songwriting "with more than half of the album featuring memorable hooks". Australian musicologist, Ian McFarlane, opined that "[it] boasted all the confident swagger and accomplished rock hooks of a band on the cusp of international acceptance".

Fellow Australian journalists, John O'Donnell, Toby Creswell and Craig Mathieson, found that Rodgers' effort with "Original Sin" had delivered a track with a "confident rhythm" and helped the band so that "they now had focus; the lyrical image ... fitted their circumstances". Meanwhile, Launay, after hearing that track, "accepted the challenge" of providing a "sense of reinvention" for the group so that "post-punk affectations and new romantic plumage were fading away, revealing a rock band with funk leanings and pop instincts".

Charting and awards
The Swing peaked at number one on the Australian Kent Music Report Albums Chart for five non-consecutive weeks from early April to mid-May 1984. It remained in the top 100 for over 100;weeks. On the New Zealand Albums Chart it reached No. 6.

Beyond its local success, this album, as its predecessor, entered the US Top 75, reaching No. 52 on the Billboard 200; it also entered the Canadian Top 40, where it reached No. 27 on the RPM 100 Albums. In Europe, The Swing entered the Top 20 in France due to the big success of its single "Original Sin" which reached the French Top 5 during the summer of 1984; and the Top 40 in the Netherlands.

In October 2010, The Swing, was listed in the book, 100 Best Australian Albums at No. 56, with their 1987 album, Kick at No. 11.

In 2011 The Swing was re-released as a remastered edition. The remastering engineer was Giovanni Scatola.

In February 2014 The Swing returned to the top 50 on the ARIA Albums Chart, with the local airing of a mini-series, INXS: Never Tear Us Apart, on the Seven Network.

Track listing

Personnel 
INXS
 Michael Hutchence – vocals
 Andrew Farriss – keyboards, guitars, string arrangements
 Kirk Pengilly – guitars, saxophone, vocals
 Tim Farriss – guitars, bass
 Garry Gary Beers – basses
 Jon Farriss – drums, percussion, vocals

Additional musicians
 William Motzing – string arrangements
 Daryl Hall – backing vocals on "Original Sin"
 Sherine Abeyratne – backing vocals
 Andrew Duffield – backing vocals
 Kim Liat Edwards – backing vocals
 Sean Kelly – backing vocals
 Norma Lewis – backing vocals
 Jenny Morris – backing vocals
 Frank Simms – backing vocals
 David Spinner – backing vocals

Production 
 Nile Rodgers – producer (1)
 Nick Launay – producer (2–10), engineer (2–10), mixing
 Jason Corsaro – engineer (1)
 Jeremy Allom – assistant engineer
 Stuart Breed – assistant engineer
 Steve "Barney" Chase – assistant engineer
 Paul Cook – assistant engineer
 David Price – assistant engineer
 Ross – assistant engineer
 Alan Wright – assistant engineer
 Philip Mortlock – cover design, photography
 Jon Watkins – artwork
 Michael Putland – front group photography, black and white photography
 Paul Clarke – photography
 Kirk Pengilly – photography
 Mixed at Townhouse Studios, AIR Studios, Sarm East Studios and Sarm West Studios (London, UK)

Charts

Weekly charts

Year-end charts

Decade-end charts

Certifications

References

1984 albums
Albums produced by Nick Launay
Albums produced by Nile Rodgers
INXS albums